The Southern Rhodesia Legislative Council election of 1905 was the third election to the Legislative Council of Southern Rhodesia. The Legislative Council had, since 1903, comprised fifteen voting members: the Administrator of Southern Rhodesia ex officio, seven members nominated by the British South Africa Company, and seven members elected by registered voters from four electoral districts. The Resident Commissioner of Southern Rhodesia, Richard Chester-Master, also sat on the Legislative Council ex officio but without the right to vote.

The election was to have taken place on March 6, 1905 but in the event all the places were filled by unopposed nominations on February 6 and so no poll was taken.

Results

Note: Raleigh Grey was absent during the whole of the 1906 session.

Nominated members
The members nominated by the British South Africa Company were:

 Sir Thomas Charles Scanlen KCMG, Additional Law Officer (also Acting Administrator from May 24, 1907 during the absence of Sir William Henry Milton)
 Francis James Newton CMG, Treasurer
 Herbert Hayton Castens, Chief Secretary
 Clarkson Henry Tredgold, Attorney-General
 James Hutchison Kennedy, Master of the High Court
 Edward Ross Townsend, Secretary for Agriculture
 Ernest William Sanders Montagu, Secretary for Mines

References
 Source Book of Parliamentary Elections and Referenda in Southern Rhodesia 1898-1962 ed. by F.M.G. Willson (Department of Government, University College of Rhodesia and Nyasaland, Salisbury 1963)
 Holders of Administrative and Ministerial Office 1894-1964 by F.M.G. Willson and G.C. Passmore, assisted by Margaret T. Mitchell (Source Book No. 3, Department of Government, University College of Rhodesia and Nyasaland, Salisbury 1966)
 Official Year Book of the Colony of Southern Rhodesia, No. 1 - 1924, Salisbury, Southern Rhodesia

1905 elections in Africa
Legislative Council election
Legislative Council election,1905
Non-partisan elections
1905 elections in the British Empire